Actinopus cornelli is a species of mygalomorph spider in the family Actinopodidae. It can be found in Brazil.

The specific name cornelli refers to grunge musician Chris Cornell.

References 

cornelli
Spiders described in 2020
Arthropods of Brazil